Newarthill is a village in North Lanarkshire, Scotland, situated roughly three miles north-east of the town of Motherwell. It has a population of around 6,200. Most local amenities are shared with the adjacent villages of Carfin, Holytown and New Stevenston which have a combined population of around 20,000 across the four localities.

History
Situated on rich tracts of coal and other minerals, the original settlement of Newarthill occurred in the early to mid-nineteenth century. Originally thought to have been named after the larger and more northerly Harthill, it has recently been discovered that historical mentions of Newarthill actually pre-date Harthill. One quoted, but unproven, derivation is the Gaelic Nuadh-Ard, meaning New Hill, with a tautological "hill" added in the English translation.

Geography
The town of Newarthill is roughly bounded by the Legbrannock Burn to the north, the railway line connecting Carfin and Cleland to the south, the junction of the B7066 with Biggar Road to the east and the A723 to the west. Situated on the northern side of the Clyde Valley, the town rises highest in the north east and slopes downward to the west. The higher land was the centre of initial settlement and holds most of the town's oldest and most significant buildings. Several modern housing estates have appeared on the outskirts and greenbelt areas of the village, rendering it less distinct from the surrounding conurbation.

There is no town centre as such, with residents chiefly relying on the amenities provided by neighbouring places such as Motherwell, Hamilton, Wishaw, Airdrie and Glasgow. It is generally considered to consist of two schemes, the older, formerly coal-heated east and the more recent, gas-powered west. This perception has altered in light of large new housing estates encircling the village.

Amenities
The local schools are Newarthill Primary, St Teresa's Primary, Keir Hardie Memorial Primary and Brannock High School. The local authority-funded community centre, also on High Street, offers a range of activities from nursery care to computing classes. The library on Kirkhall Road offers a modern range of books and other media despite the distinctly 1970s exterior. Sports facilities are few and far between, with the existing pitches within school grounds long since closed to the general public.

The local police station which previously lay near the centre of the village has been converted to houses. Fire brigade and hospital facilities have to be sought outwith Newarthill. The nearest hospitals are Wishaw General and Monklands Infirmary in Airdrie. There are two main places of worship, St. Teresa's Chapel and Newarthill Parish Church, with the nearest mosque in New Stevenston.

Travel and transport facilities
Newarthill is situated in close proximity to the M8, offering road connections to Glasgow, Edinburgh, between and beyond. The B7066 is the major connecting route to Carfin and Motherwell, while those heading west on minor roads will generally do so through Holytown, Mossend and beyond. These roads are well served by regular bus services by companies including First Glasgow 254 and united 1 These services generally operate until 5pm. Service is limited on Sundays. There are several local taxi companies with varying levels of service.

There is a two-hourly service on Sundays.

Sports and Leisure
Newarthill Bowling Club exists just off High Street and adjacent to Newarthill Primary School, however it remains a members-only facility. On Mosshall Street, there are several football pitches and an amateur boxing club.

Newarthill has few leisure facilities of note, excepting the facilities within Brannock High School and at Mosshall Street (where the boxing club is located). The village is, however, situated very close to several large sports facilities in the surrounding area, with Dalziel Park (sports fields and golf club), Colville Park Golf Club and Ravenscraig Sports Centre. The residents of Newarthill make use largely of the Aquatec Leisure Centre which is located on the outskirts of nearby Motherwell Town Centre. The facilities available here include a family friendly swimming pool and a well equipped gym.

The Torrance Park golf course and leisure facility between Newarthill and Newhouse was completed in 2019,  forming part of a wider residential development off the main road to Holytown and nominally linked to that village in documentation, but sharing a postcode with Newarthill and being counted alongside it in some statistics.

There is also a local amateur football team, Newarthill Athletic AFC, who were founded in 2015. They follow a long list of teams from the area including Yett Farm Boys Club.

Public houses and takeaways

Newarthill, like several surrounding villages, boasts its fair share of public houses and licensed establishments. These are concentrated in the High Street area and have consistently closed and reopened at the mercy of the drinking public. Currently these include Bar Mango, the Cottage Inn, Newarthill Bowling Club, The Club (formerly Newarthill Working Men's Club), The Oranger, and the Hibernian Social Club.

There is a similar volume of fast food takeaways of the more traditional variety - there are Indian and fish and chip restaurants, but no multinational brands. The Bakers Oven, a small cafe, has a small sit-in area, 'Taste' (a Coffee and Sandwich bar) was situated on the High Street but recently closed and the premises have been converted to an extension for the next door veterinary surgery.

There used to be a local Post Office and a Spar, but it was demolished after a fire burned it down on Christmas Day 2009. A Nisa Local convenience store (opened Nov 2010) has been built on the Spar site, which does have a post office, and is one of only a few small food stores in the village. The main tourist accommodation, the Silverburn Hotel was damaged in a fire and having been foreclosed for over a year, has recently been demolished.

Notable figures

 Damian Barr, journalist
Charlie Flynn, boxer
 Rhonda Jones, footballer
 Christopher Kane, fashion designer
 Liz Lochhead, playwright, author and former Poet Laureate of Scotland
 Gary McAllister,  Scotland international midfielder
 Sir Robert McAlpine, construction industry figure
 Hugh McJarrow, footballer
Leigh Nicol, footballer
Elaine C, Smith, actress and comedian
 Jock Watson, footballer

References

External links

Motherwell
Villages in North Lanarkshire
Mining communities in Scotland